The  is an urban expressway in Nagoya, Japan. It is a part of the Nagoya Expressway network and is owned and operated by Nagoya Expressway Public Corporation.

Overview

The Ring Route forms a rectangular loop around downtown Nagoya. It is one-way only and flows clockwise with 2 to 4 lanes of traffic. Routes 1 through 6 of the Nagoya Expressway network extend radially from the Ring Route (Route 2 bisects it). The Ring Route also serves as the origin point for these expressways.

The first section of the route was opened to traffic in 1985 and the route was completed in 1995. The future Sannō Junction will link the Ring Route to Route 4 which is under construction.

In Gaming 
The Nagoya Expressway Ring Route is used in Wangan Midnight Maximum Tune 6 as the Nagoya Area map, or the Nagoya Speed Ring. However, when playing on this map you race for 14.9 km, going around the Ring Route more than one time but less than twice. Around the Marunouchi Exit, there are orange lights on the border of the roadway that illuminate at night, just like the actual expressway.

Interchange list

 JCT - junction

References

External links
 Nagoya Expressway Public Corporation

Ring roads in Japan
Nagoya Expressway